A parasympathomimetic drug, sometimes called a cholinomimetic drug or cholinergic receptor stimulating agent, is a substance that stimulates the parasympathetic nervous system (PSNS). These chemicals are also called cholinergic drugs because acetylcholine (ACh) is the neurotransmitter used by the PSNS. Chemicals in this family can act either directly by stimulating the nicotinic or muscarinic receptors (thus mimicking acetylcholine), or indirectly by inhibiting cholinesterase, promoting acetylcholine release, or other mechanisms. Common uses of parasympathomimetics include glaucoma, Sjögren syndrome and underactive bladder.

Some chemical weapons such as sarin or VX, non-lethal riot control agents such as tear gas, and insecticides such as diazinon fall into this category.

Structure activity relationships for parasympathomimetic drugs
For a cholinergic agent, the following criteria describe the structure activity relationship:
 Ing's Rule of 5: there should be no more than five atoms between the nitrogen and the terminal hydrogen for muscarinic (or cholinergic) activity;
 the molecule must possess a nitrogen atom capable of bearing a positive charge, preferably a quaternary ammonium salt;
 for maximum potency, the size of the alkyl groups substituted on the nitrogen should not exceed the size of a methyl group;
 the molecule should have an oxygen atom, preferably an ester-like oxygen capable of participating in a hydrogen bond;
 there should be a two-carbon unit between the oxygen atom and the nitrogen atom.

Pharmaceuticals/Supplements

Direct-acting
These act by stimulating the nicotinic or muscarinic receptors.
 Choline esters
 Acetylcholine (all acetylcholine receptors)
 Bethanechol (M3 receptors)
 Carbachol (all muscarinic receptors and some nicotinic receptors)
 Methacholine (all muscarinic receptors)
 Plant alkaloids
 Arecoline
 Nicotine
 Muscarine
 Pilocarpine (M3 receptors)

Indirect-acting
Indirect acting parasympathomimetic substances may be either reversible cholinesterase inhibitors, irreversible cholinesterase inhibitors or substances that promote ACh release or anti-adrenergics. The latter inhibits the antagonistic system, the sympathetic nervous system.
 Reversible cholinesterase inhibitors
 Donepezil
 Edrophonium
 Neostigmine
 Physostigmine
 Pyridostigmine
 Rivastigmine
 Tacrine
 Caffeine (non-competitive)
 Huperzine A
 Irreversible cholinesterase inhibitors
 Echothiophate
 Isoflurophate
 Malathion
 ACh release promoters
 Alpha GPC
 Cisapride
 Droperidol
 Domperidone
 Metoclopramide
 Risperidone
 Paliperidone
 Anti-adrenergics: See also alpha blocker and beta blocker
 Clonidine (α-receptor agonist, α2 > α1, giving negative feedback)
 Methyldopa (α2 agonist, giving negative feedback)
 Propranolol (β-receptor antagonist)
 Metoprolol (β-receptor antagonist)
 Atenolol (β1 antagonist)
 Prazosin (α1 antagonist)
 Oxymetazoline (partial α2 adrenergic agonist)

See also
 Sympathomimetic drug
 Parasympatholytics
 sympatholytics

References

External links
 

Parasympathomimetics